Robert Smith  is a former Canadian football offensive lineman who won a Grey Cup championship with the British Columbia Lions in 1994.

References

1958 births
Living people
BC Lions players
Calgary Stampeders players
Canadian football offensive linemen
Montreal Concordes players
Ottawa Rough Riders players
People from New Westminster
Players of Canadian football from British Columbia
Toronto Argonauts players
Utah State Aggies football players